The Hague Divorce Convention, officially Convention on the Recognition of Divorces and Legal Separations is a convention concluded by the Hague Conference on Private International Law (HCCH). It regulates the recognition of divorces and legal separations provided they have been performed according to the correct legal process in the state where the divorce was obtained. Not all divorces need to be recognized under the convention. Only those divorces obtained in a state where (at the time of the start of the proceedings);
the "respondent" (the person against whom proceedings were started) had its residence
the "petitioner" (the person starting the procedures) had his residence (for at least a year; or: together with his/her spouse)
corresponds to the nationality of both spouses
corresponds to the nationality of the petitioner and where he lived, or had lived for 1 year in the past 2 years
corresponds to the nationality of the petitioner, and where he is present, while the last state of their joint residence does not provide for divorce

Parties
As of March 2013, 20 states were parties to the convention. The parties are all in Europe, except Australia, Egypt and Hong Kong. The convention is open to all countries. Countries that signed the convention, became a Party by subsequent ratification. Other countries can accede to the convention. When a country ratifies, it automatically becomes applicable between all countries that are party to the convention, whereas the accession only becomes applicable when the other country accepts that accession. Regarding members of the European Union (except Denmark), the Brussels II regulation (which handles conflict of law regarding divorce and parental responsibility) supersedes the convention. The UK government has stated that in the event of withdrawal from the European Union in March 2019 without a treaty, the UK would continue to use the Hague Divorce Convention to recognise overseas divorces.

External links
 Treaty text
Ratifications

References 

Treaties concluded in 1970
Treaties entered into force in 1975
Hague Conference on Private International Law conventions
Divorce law
Treaties of Albania
Treaties of Australia
Treaties extended to British Hong Kong
Treaties of Cyprus
Treaties of the Czech Republic
Treaties of Czechoslovakia
Treaties of Denmark
Treaties of Egypt
Treaties of Estonia
Treaties of Finland
Treaties of Italy
Treaties of Luxembourg
Treaties of Moldova
Treaties of Norway
Treaties of Poland
Treaties of the Netherlands
Treaties of Portugal
Treaties of Slovakia
Treaties of Sweden
Treaties of Switzerland
Treaties of the United Kingdom
Family law treaties
1970 in the Netherlands
Treaties extended to Norfolk Island
Treaties extended to Aruba
Treaties extended to Bermuda
Treaties extended to Gibraltar
Treaties extended to Guernsey
Treaties extended to Jersey
Treaties extended to the Isle of Man
Treaties extended to Portuguese Macau